The women's discus throw event at the 1990 World Junior Championships in Athletics was held in Plovdiv, Bulgaria, at Deveti Septemvri Stadium on 11 and 12 August.

Medalists

Results

Final
12 August

Qualifications
11 Aug

Group A

Participation
According to an unofficial count, 25 athletes from 17 countries participated in the event.

References

Discus throw
Discus throw at the World Athletics U20 Championships